Barra do Dande is a town, with a population of 75,000 (2014), and a commune in the municipality of Dande, province of Bengo, Angola.

It is located at the mouth of the Dande River.

The government plans to build a deep-water port at Barra do Dande. This new port is about 30 km north of Luanda.

See also
List of lighthouses in Angola

References 

Populated places in Bengo Province
Communes in Bengo Province
Lighthouses in Angola